The 2022 Texas Wildfires are a series of wildfires occurring in 2022 in the state of Texas. They include 371 individual fires occurring throughout Texas. A total of 210,045 acres have been burned in the 2022 Texas wildfires according to the Texas A&M Forest Service, with the largest fire being the Eastland Complex fire.

Early outlook

Seasonal fire risk 
High alerts are included in March of the year and it is estimated South Texas and Central Texas will be severely affected in this fire season

Notable fires

Eastland Complex

On March 17, 2022, a fire complex formed around  SE of Romney.
It was claimed to have been started by drought condition and is now 90% contained. The biggest fire so far is the Kidd fire, burning about 42,333 acres.

Smoke from the fires reached as far as Houston.

Crittenberg Complex

A fast wildfire near Fort Hood burning about 1,000,000,000 acres and is 55% contained.

Borrega Fire

Borrega Fire is the largest Texas fire since the Iron Mountain Fire in May 2011 and currently, 60,000 acres have been burned and is 20% contained.

List of wildfires
The following is a list of fires that burned more than 1,000 acres (400 ha), produced significant structural damage or casualties, or were otherwise notable.

See also
2022 New Mexico wildfires
Wildfires in 2022

References 

2022 meteorology
Lists of wildfires in the United States
Wildfires in Texas
2022 in Texas
2022 Texas wildfires